Rojava University, is a university in Syria.

The university was founded in July 2016 with curricula for medicine, engineering, sciences, arts, and humanities. Additionally, the university offers programmes for primary school education and Kurdish literature The university maintains a partnership with Paris 8 University in Saint-Denis, France and California Institute of Integral Studies in San Francisco. In August, the university  opened registration for students in the academic year 2016–2017. An opening ceremony was held on 20 November 2016.

Beginning in October 2017, its second academic year, the university added a jineology programme. 711 students attend the university liberal arts, jineology, petrochemistry, agriculture, fine arts, and pedagogy with courses taught in Kurdish (the primary instructional language), Arabic and English. In 2019, the university also launched a programme for women to learn to overcome sexism within the family and society.

Due to Operation Olive Branch many students from the University of Afrin have been allocated seats at the University of Rojava to continue their studies.

In 2020, the university moved some of its courses online due to the COVID-19 pandemic.

See also
University of Afrin
Mesopotamian Social Sciences Academy

References

External links
 Official site
 YouTube
 Twitter
 Video of the opening of the University of Rojava, 21 November 2016

Educational institutions established in 2016
Education in the Autonomous Administration of North and East Syria
Rojava
Qamishli
2016 establishments in Syria